Clair Bidez is an American former professional snowboarder and research analyst.

Snowboarding career
Bidez began competing in snowboarding competitions at age ten, after realizing that her brother, Dylan, was having more fun as a snowboarder than she was as a skier.

When she was 16, she placed 5th at the US Open at Stratton Mountain and was asked to join the U.S. Snowboarding team soon after.

In 2006, she became the Halfpipe Junior World Champion in Vivaldi Park, South Korea. At the Winter X Games XX, she placed 4th in halfpipe competition. In the last Grand Prix of 2009 at Copper Mountain, she broke her heel in the finals.

After recovering from her injury, Bidez made it to finals in every Olympic qualifier and was featured in the 2010 Sports Illustrated Swimsuit Edition as a potential Olympian, but a persistent ankle injury turned out to be the end of her professional snowboard career. The injury, along with a desire to go back to school, influenced her decision to retire from competitive snowboarding.

Personal life
Bidez was born in 1987 and grew up in Minturn, Colorado. Her younger brother Dylan was also a member of the U.S. Snowboarding Team.

Bidez earned a Bachelor of Science degree from Westminster College (through a special Tuition Grant Program with USSA) and a Master of Science degree in Geography from the University of Utah.

References

Living people
American female snowboarders
Sportspeople from Colorado
1987 births
Westminster College (Utah) alumni
University of Utah alumni
21st-century American women
People from Eagle County, Colorado